During the 2018–19 Belgian football season, Standard Liège competed in the Belgian Pro League.

Players

Current squad

Out on loan

Competitions

Belgian First Division A

League table
Regular season

Championship play-offs

Belgian Cup

Belgian Super Cup

UEFA Europa League

Group stage

Statistics

Appearances and goals

|-
! colspan=16 style=background:#dcdcdc; text-align:center| Goalkeepers

|-
! colspan=16 style=background:#dcdcdc; text-align:center| Defenders

|-
! colspan=16 style=background:#dcdcdc; text-align:center| Midfielders

|-
! colspan=16 style=background:#dcdcdc; text-align:center| Forwards

|-
! colspan=16 style=background:#dcdcdc; text-align:center| Players transferred out during the season

Notes

References

Standard Liège seasons